The 252nd Armor Regiment is an armored regiment of the North Carolina Army National Guard, part of the 30th Armored Brigade Combat Team, which in turn is part of the 29th Infantry Division. The 252nd provides the majority of the 30th's heavy armor assets; the only other tank unit in "Old Hickory" is D Troop of the 150th Cavalry Regiment.

1st Battalion, 252nd Armor is the currently the only active unit within the regiment, fielding 3 tank companies and 1 infantry company, stationed at various locations around North Carolina.

History 
The 252nd Armor Regiment was originally constituted on 20 March 1959 as the 196th Armor for the North Carolina Army National Guard as a parent regiment under the Combat Arms Regimental System and assigned to the 30th Infantry Division. Twelve days later, on 1 April 1959, 3rd Battalion, 139th Infantry Regiment and the 130th Tank Battalion, both from the 30th Infantry Division, were re-flagged and reassigned to the regiment as the 1st Reconnaissance Squadron and the 2nd Medium Tank Battalion, respectively. On 10 March 1963, the regiment was reorganized as the 252nd Armor Regiment, consisting of 1st and 2nd Battalions as elements of the 30th Infantry Division (concurrently, the former 196th Armor Regiment was reconstituted and reorganized from existing units of the North Carolina Army National Guard as the 196th Cavalry Regiment, hereafter a separate lineage).

After the 30th Infantry Division was reorganized as the 30th Infantry Brigade, the regiment was reorganized as well. On 1 December 1973, 1st Battalion was reorganized as an element of the 30th Infantry Brigade, while 2nd Battalion was reorganized as a separate armor battalion of the North Carolina Army National Guard, where it was later deactivated. On 1 June 1989, the regiment was withdrawn from the Combat Arms Regimental System and reorganized under the United States Army Regimental System.

1st Battalion, 252nd Armor deployed with the rest of 30th Brigade for a year-long tour of duty to Iraq in February 2004. While this was the first combat deployment for the battalion as a whole, B Company had previously completed a six-month deployment to the Balkans from October 2000 to March 2001 with Task Force Eagle.

1st Battalion, 252nd Armor deployed back to Baghdad, Iraq on 18 April 2009 in support of Operation Iraqi Freedom 9. This was their second deployment as a battalion, but their first deployment as a brigade in whole. Over 4,000 soldiers were deployed and stationed throughout Baghdad. C Company, 1/252 CAB ran over 600 Combat missions during a 10-month period making them the most used unit in the Combat Arms perspective for the 30th Brigade. 2nd Platoon of C Company was hit on two separate occasions with Improvised explosive devices approximately 1 week apart. 3rd Platoon, C Company was ambushed north of FOB Falcon in the Saydiyah district. Over 10 insurgents were captured with no injuries or casualties to 3rd Platoon.

After redeploying from Iraq in 2005, the 30th Infantry Brigade began the process of converting from an enhanced heavy separate brigade to the new heavy brigade combat team table of organization and equipment. As part of this reorganization, 1st Battalion was converted to a combined arms battalion.

Lineage

 Constituted 20 March 1959 in the North Carolina Army National Guard as the 196th Armor, a parent regiment under the Combat Arms Regimental System
 Organized 1 April 1959 from existing units to consist of the 1st Reconnaissance Squadron and the 2d Medium Tank Battalion, elements of the 30th Infantry Division
 Reorganized and redesignated 10 March 1963 as the 252d Armor to consist of the 1st and 2d Battalions, elements of the 30th Infantry Division
 Reorganized 1 December 1973 to consist of the 1st Battalion, an element of the 30th Infantry Brigade, and the 2d Battalion
 Withdrawn 1 June 1989 from the Combat Arms Regimental System and reorganized under the United States Army Regimental System with Headquarters at Fayetteville
 Reorganized 1 September 1996 to consist of the 1st Battalion, an element of the 30th Infantry Brigade
 Ordered into active Federal service 1 October 2003 at home stations
 30th Infantry Brigade converted, reorganized, and redesignated 1 September 2004 as the 30th Armored Brigade
 Released from active Federal service 28 March 2005 and reverted to state control
 Reorganized 1 September 2005 to consist of the 1st Battalion, an element of the 30th Armored Brigade Combat Team
 Redesignated 1 October 2005 as the 252d Armored Regiment
 Ordered into active Federal service 11 February 2009 at home stations; released from active Federal service 17 March 2010 and reverted to state control

Current organization
1st Battalion currently has companies in the following locations in North Carolina:
 Headquarters and Headquarters Company (HHC) located in Fayetteville, North Carolina
 A Company (Armor) located in Williamston, North Carolina
 B Company (Armor) located in Smithfield, North Carolina
 C Company (Infantry) located in Southern Pines, North Carolina
 D Company (Armor) located in Sanford, North Carolina

Distinctive unit insignia
 Description
A gold color metal and enamel device  in width consisting of a red embattled arrowhead charged with a gold fleur-de-lis flanked and surmounted on either side by a pierced green mullet. The device is supported by a tri-segmented gold scroll inscribed "READY" "POISED" "DECISIVE" in black letters.
 Symbolism
The pierced green mullets (simulating spur rowels) surmounting a gold fleur-de-lis represent service in Europe during World War II. The red embattled arrowhead simulates the spirit of the unit and is symbolic of the motto "Ready, Poised and Decisive".  The red and green together refer to the decorations of the French Croix-de-Guerre and the Belgian Fourragere awarded to elements of the Regiment.
 Background
The distinctive unit insignia was approved on 16 November 1966. It was amended to change the symbolism on 29 January 1970.

Coat of arms
Blazon
 Shield: Or, a fleur-de-lis Gules between in chief two mullets Vert pierced of the field.
 Crest: That for the regiments and separate battalions of the North Carolina Army National Guard: On a wreath of the colors Or and Vert, a hornet's nest handing from a bough beset with 13 hornets all Proper.
 Motto: "Ready, Poised, Decisive"
 Symbolism
 Yellow is the color used to denote Armor and the pierced mullets simulate spur rowels and refer to service in World War II. The fleur-de-lis alludes to France and Italy and represents the World War II campaigns in those countries. The colors red and green refer to the decorations of the French Croix-de-Guerre and the Belgian Fourragere awarded to elements of the Regiment.
 Crest: The crest is that of the North Carolina Army National Guard.
 Background: The coat of arms was approved on 7 July 1966. It was amended to change the symbolism on 29 January 1970.

See also
 List of armored and cavalry regiments of the United States Army

References 

Military units and formations in North Carolina
Armor 252
Armored regiments of the United States Army
Military units and formations established in 1959